The following is a list of notable deaths in March 2011.

Entries for each day are listed alphabetically by surname. A typical entry lists information in the following sequence:
 Name, age, country of citizenship at birth, subsequent country of citizenship (if applicable), reason for notability, cause of death (if known), and reference.

March 2011

1
Barklie Lakin, 96, British industrialist (Chairman of Vickers Armstrong) and naval officer.
Leonard Lomell, 91, American World War II veteran, recipient of the Silver Star and Purple Heart, natural causes.
John M. Lounge, 64, American NASA astronaut (1981–1991), complications from liver cancer.
Ion Monea, 70, Romanian Olympic silver (1968) and bronze (1960) medal-winning boxer.
Alina Paim, 91, Brazilian novelist.
Fateh Singh Rathore, 72, Indian wildlife conservationist.
Hazel Rowley, 59, British-born Australian writer (Tête-à-tête), cerebral haemorrhage.

2
Nicholas Alden, 25, American airman, shot.
Simeonie Amagoalik, 77, Canadian carver, cancer.
Louis Bazin, 90, French orientalist.
Shahbaz Bhatti, 42, Pakistani politician, Minister for Minorities (since 2008), shot.
Anthony Brooke, 98, British heir to the Sarawakan throne.
Bernard Cywinski, 70, American architect (Apple Store), partner and co-founder of Bohlin Cywinski Jackson, cancer.
John Haines, 86, American poet.
Erling Kroner, 67, Danish trombonist and bandleader, cancer.
Edward Barnes Leisenring, Jr., 85, American businessman.
Sir Allan Louisy, 94, Saint Lucian politician and judge, Prime Minister (1979–1981).
Luis Martínez Villicaña, 71, Mexican politician, Governor of Michoacán (1986–1988), Secretary of Agrarian Reform (1982–1986).
Ruby Muhammad, 103, American spiritual figure, lung cancer.
Art Statuto, 85, American football player (Los Angeles Rams).
Thor Vilhjálmsson, 85, Icelandic author, natural causes.
Wu Jieping, 94, Chinese medical scientist and politician.

3
Aldo Clementi, 85, Italian composer.
May Cutler, 87, Canadian author and publisher, founder of Tundra Books, first female Mayor of Westmount, Quebec (1987–1991).
Paquito Diaz, 73, Filipino actor, complications from a stroke.
James L. Elliot, 67, American astronomer, discovered rings of Uranus.
Lasse Eriksson, 61, Swedish comedian.
Goga Kapoor, 70, Indian actor.
Irena Kwiatkowska, 98, Polish actress.
Al Morgan, 91, American novelist and television producer (The Today Show), after long illness.
Venkatraman Radhakrishnan, 81, Indian astrophysicist, cardiac complications.
Theron Strinden, 91, American politician.
James Travers, 62, Canadian journalist, political correspondent (Toronto Star), editor in chief (Ottawa Citizen, 1991–1996), post-surgery complications.

4
Bertil Almgren, 92, Swedish archaeologist.
Charles F. Ashley, 74, American member of the Alabama House of Representatives (1982–1983).
Paul Baxley, 87, American actor and stunt coordinator (The Dukes of Hazzard, Star Trek, Kolchak: The Night Stalker).
Krishna Prasad Bhattarai, 86, Nepali Prime Minister (1990–1991, 1999–2000), multiple organ failure.
Mary Bowermaster, 93, American masters athletics champion.
Frank Chirkinian, 84, American producer (CBS Sports), lung cancer.
Annie Fargue, 76, French actress and manager, cancer.
Vivienne Harris, 89, British businesswoman and newspaper publisher, co-founder of the Jewish Telegraph.
Charles Jarrott, 83, British film and television director (Anne of the Thousand Days), prostate cancer.
Chester Kahapea, 65, American soil scientist, known as the "face of Hawaiian statehood", complications of Lou Gehrig's disease.
Ed Manning, 68, American basketball player (Baltimore Bullets) and coach (San Antonio Spurs), heart condition.
Johnny Preston, 71, American pop singer ("Running Bear"), heart failure.
Mikhail Simonov, 81, Russian aircraft designer, chief designer of the Sukhoi Design Bureau (1983–2011), after long illness.
Arjun Singh, 80, Indian politician, Minister of Human Resource Development (2004–2009), heart attack.
Alenush Terian, 90, Iranian astronomer and physicist.
María Ugarte, 97, Spanish-Dominican author, historian and journalist.
Simon van der Meer, 85, Dutch physicist and Nobel laureate.

5
Eivor Alm, 86, Swedish Olympic cross-country skier.
Jimmy Carnes, 76, American track and field athlete, coach and administrator, cancer.
Mario Coppola, 74, Italian nuclear physicist.
Alberto Granado, 88, Argentine-born Cuban biochemist and writer, travel companion of Che Guevara (The Motorcycle Diaries).
Oswald Georg Hirmer, 81, German-born South African Roman Catholic missionary, Bishop of Umtata (1997–2008).
Manolis Rasoulis, 65, Greek singer-songwriter, author and journalist.
Viktor Voroshilov, 84, Soviet footballer.

6
Jean Bartel, 87, American actress, Miss America 1943.
Marie Andrée Bertrand, 85, Canadian criminologist, feminist and anti-prohibitionist.
Patricia Brennan, 66, Australian feminist and clinician, advocate of women Anglican priests, cancer.
Rostislav Čtvrtlík, 47, Czech stage, television and voice actor, brain tumor.
Mike DeStefano, 44, American comedian (Last Comic Standing), heart attack.
Jaime Felipa, 66, Netherlands Antilles judoka.
Oddmund Jensen, 82, Norwegian Olympic cross-country skier.
John Morton, 86, New Zealand biologist and theologian.
Ján Popluhár, 75, Slovak footballer (1962 FIFA World Cup).
Louie Ramsay, 81, British actress (The Ruth Rendell Mysteries).
Reg Stewart, 85, English footballer (Colchester United), natural causes.
Edward Ullendorff, 91, British historian.
Frank Ziegler, 87, American football player (Philadelphia Eagles).

7
Cándido Bidó, 74, Dominican painter, cardio-respiratory failure.
Vladimir Brazhnikov, 69, Russian football coach, myocardial infarction.
Frank Dezelan, 80, American baseball umpire (1958–1970).
Adrián Escudero, 83, Spanish footballer.
Samuel Hazard Gillespie Jr., 100, American lawyer and politician, pancreatic cancer.
Rudy Salud, 72, Filipino sports executive, PBA Commissioner (1988–1992), complications from surgery.

8
Iraj Afshar, 85, Iranian bibliographer and historian.
Victor Manuel Blanco, 92, American astronomer, director of the Cerro Tololo Inter-American Observatory.
Masoud Boroumand, 83, Iranian football player.
Richard Campbell, 55, British player of cello and viola da gamba.
Herb Kawainui Kane, 82, American artist, Hawaiian cultural advocate, participant in the Hokulea voyage.
Moses Katjiuongua, 68, Namibian politician.
Jim Keane, 87, American football player (Chicago Bears, Green Bay Packers).
Steven Kroll, 69, American children's book author, surgical complications.
St. Clair Lee, 66, American musician (The Hues Corporation), natural causes.
Bronko Nagurski Jr., 73, American player of Canadian football (Hamilton Tiger-Cats).
John Olmsted, 73, American naturalist and conservationist, liver cancer.
Mike Starr, 44, American bassist (Alice in Chains, Sun Red Sun).

9
Muftah Anaqrat, Libyan general, shot.
Sona Aslanova, 86, Azerbaijani soprano.
Edward Bertels, 78, Belgian footballer 
Jacques Brichant, 80, Belgian tennis player.
David S. Broder, 81, American journalist (The Washington Post), complications from diabetes.
Edward A. Burdick, 89, American civil servant.
Doris Burn, 87, American children's book author and illustrator.
Seán Cronin, 91, Irish journalist and republican, Irish Republican Army chief of staff (1957–1958, 1959–1960), after long illness.
Armando Goyena, 88, Filipino actor.
Valgerður Hafstað, 80, Icelandic painter.
Andrew Hao, 95, Chinese Roman Catholic underground Bishop of Xiwanzi (since 1984).
Bob Marcucci, 81, American talent agent, respiratory complications.
Bob McNamara, 94, American baseball player (Philadelphia Athletics).
Des Meagher, 67, Australian footballer (Hawthorn).
Lindy Pearson, 82, American football player (Detroit Lions).
Inge Sørensen, 86, Danish swimmer and Olympic bronze medalist (1936).
Toshiko Takaezu, 88, American ceramic artist.

10
Armand Bigot, 76, French Olympic equestrian.
Bill Blackbeard, 84, American comic strip writer and editor.
Bob Callahan, 87, American football player (Buffalo Bills).
Nick Harbaruk, 67, Polish-born Canadian ice hockey player, bone cancer.
Don Boven, 86, American basketball player and coach (Western Michigan University), heart disease.
Baliram Kashyap, 74, Indian politician, MP for Bastar (since 1998), after long illness.
Gabriel Laderman, 81, American painter, cancer,
Danny Paton, 75, Scottish footballer.
Emmett J. Rice, 91, American economist and banking official, heart failure.
Eddie Snyder, 92, American composer ("Strangers in the Night", "Spanish Eyes").
David Viñas, 83, Argentine dramatist, critic and novelist, pneumonic infection.

11
David Brown, 69, British cricketer, brain tumour.
Osvaldo Rodrigues da Cunha, 80, Brazilian paleontologist and herpetologist.
Val Ffrench Blake, 98, British army officer and author.
Alfred Genovese, 79, American oboist, complications from cardiac arrest.
Jack Hardy, 63, American singer-songwriter.
Nancy Kominsky, 95, American art teacher and broadcaster.
Hugh Martin, 96, American songwriter ("Have Yourself a Merry Little Christmas") and film composer (Meet Me in St. Louis), natural causes.
Nick Mohammed, 85, Canadian Olympian Olympedia – Nick Mohammed
Héctor Francisco Medina Polanco, 37, Honduran television journalist, shot.
Frank Neuhauser, 97, American patent attorney and spelling bee champion, winner of the 1925 National Spelling Bee by spelling the word "Gladiolus".
Valter Nyström, 95, Swedish Olympic track and field athlete.
Danny Stiles, 87, American radio host.
Donny George Youkhanna, 60, Iraqi archaeologist, anthropologist and author, heart attack.
Notable Japanese killed during the 2011 Tōhoku earthquake and tsunami:
Miki Endo, 25, voice warning and alarm agent.
Takashi Shimokawara, 104, masters athlete.

12
Ali Hassan al-Jaber, 56, Qatari photojournalist (Al Jazeera), shot.
Donald Brenner, 64, Canadian judge, Chief Justice of the Supreme Court of British Columbia (2000–2009).
Bruce Campbell, 87, Canadian politician.
Olive Dickason, 91, Canadian historian and author.
Juan García-Santacruz Ortiz, 77, Spanish Roman Catholic prelate, Bishop of Guadix (1992–2009).
Indrajitsinhji, 73, Indian cricketer, cancer.
Shifra Lerer, 95, Argentinian-born American Yiddish theatre actress, stroke.
Joe Morello, 82, American drummer (The Dave Brubeck Quartet).
John Nettleship, 71, British teacher, inspiration for character of Severus Snape, cancer.
Mitchell Page, 59, American baseball player (Oakland Athletics), and coach (St. Louis Cardinals, Washington Nationals).
Nilla Pizzi, 91, Italian singer.
Tawfik Toubi, 88, Israeli Arab politician, last surviving member of the first Knesset.

13
Barbara Ball, 86, Bermudian physician, politician and social activist.
Roy Flatt, 63, Scottish Anglican priest.
Sir Michael Gray, 78, British army general.
Marko Horvatin, 91, Croatian Olympic rower.
Virginia Klinekole, 86, American politician, first female President of the Mescalero Apache.
Brian Lanker, 63, American photojournalist, pancreatic cancer.
Rick Martin, 59, Canadian ice hockey player (Buffalo Sabres, Los Angeles Kings), heart attack.
Ritchie Pickett, 56, New Zealand country singer.
David Rumelhart, 68, American psychologist, created computer simulations of neural processing, Pick's disease.
Nicholas Smisko, 75, American clergyman, Head of the American Carpatho-Russian Orthodox Diocese (since 1984), cancer.
Jean Smith, 82, American baseball player (All-American Girls Professional Baseball League).
Owsley Stanley, 76, American-born Australian underground LSD chemist and sound engineer (Grateful Dead), traffic accident.
Leo Steinberg, 90, American art historian and critic.
Vitaly Vulf, 80, Russian theater critic and television host.

14
Gerald Barry, 63, Irish journalist and broadcaster, illness.
Alfred Baumeister, 76, American psychologist and professor.
Todd Cerney, 57, American country musician and producer, melanoma.
Leslie Collier, 90, British virologist.
José Pinto Correia, 80, Portuguese politician, Governor of Macau (1986–1987).
Bob Greaves, 76, British journalist and broadcaster, cancer.
Jülide Gülizar, 82, Turkish anchorwoman, one of the nation's first television presenters.
Eduard Gushchin, 70, Russian Olympic bronze medal-winning (1968) athlete.
Big Jack Johnson, 70, American guitarist and blues singer.
Giora Leshem, 71, Israeli poet and publisher.
G. Alan Marlatt, 69, American professor, kidney failure.
Larry Zolf, 76, Canadian journalist and humorist.

15
José Agdamag, 89, Filipino soldier and Olympic sports shooter.
Mirko Aksentijević, 88, Serbian journalist and basketball executive.
Julie Apap, 62, Maltese ceramicist.
Amos Bar, 79, Israeli author.
Keith Fordyce, 82, British radio and television presenter (Ready Steady Go!).
Frank Howard, 85, Canadian politician, member of the BC Legislative Assembly for Skeena (1953–1956; 1979–1986), MP for Skeena (1957–1974).
Musa Juma, 42, Kenyan musician, pneumonia.
Yakov Kreizberg, 51, Russian-born Austrian-American conductor.
Jean Liedloff, 84, American writer.
Peter Loader, 81, British cricketer.
Marty Marion, 94, American baseball player and manager, National League MVP (1944).
*Nate Dogg, 41, American musician, stroke.
Fred Sanford, 91, American baseball player.
Robert Schoonjans, 85, Belgian Olympic athlete.
*Smiley Culture, 48, British reggae singer and DJ, apparent suicide by stabbing.
Melvin Sparks, 64, American jazz and soul guitarist, heart attack.

16
Abdikadir Yusuf Aar, Somalian terrorist, shot.
Josefina Aldecoa, 85, Spanish writer and teacher, respiratory complications.
Sándor Arnóth, 51, Hungarian politician, car accident.
Sadiq Batcha, 47, Indian businessman and politician, suicide by hanging.
Carel Boshoff, 83, South African religious and cultural activist, cancer.
Betty Lowman Carey, 96, American rower.
Tom Dunbar, 51, American baseball player (Texas Rangers).
Al Israel, 75, American actor (Scarface, Carlito's Way, Drop Zone).
Thomas Nkuissi, 82, Cameroonian Roman Catholic prelate, Bishop of Nkongsamba (1978–1992).
Lloyd Oliver, 88, American veteran, World War II code talker.
James Pritchett, 88, American actor (The Doctors).
Lorenda Starfelt, 56, American producer, cancer.
James C. Tyree, 53, American businessman, chairman and CEO of the Chicago Sun-Times, cancer.
Murray Warmath, 98, American college football coach (Minnesota Golden Gophers), natural causes.
Richard Wirthlin, 80, American political strategist and religious leader, renal failure.

17
Moisis Michail Bourlas, 92, Greek Resistance veteran.
Banny deBrum, 54, Marshallese diplomat, Ambassador to the United States (1996–2008, 2009–2011) and Canada (1999–2011).
Michael Gough, 94, British actor (Dracula, Batman, Sleepy Hollow), after short illness.
Abdel Moneim El-Guindi, 74, Egyptian Olympic bronze medal-winning (1960) boxer.
Ferlin Husky, 85, American country music singer, heart failure.
Don Kennard, 81, American politician, Texas State Senator (1963–1973).
Murdoch Mitchison, 88, British zoologist.
J.B. Steane, 83, British music critic.

18
Robert Angeloch, 88, American artist.
*Princess Antoinette, Baroness of Massy, 90, Monegasque princess.
George Bacon, 93, British physicist.
Ze'ev Boim, 67, Israeli Knesset member, cancer.
Enzo Cannavale, 82, Italian actor (Cinema Paradiso).
Warren Christopher, 85, American diplomat, Secretary of State (1993–1997), complications from kidney and bladder cancer.
Alphonse De Vreese, 89, French cyclist.
Arthur Charles Evans, 94, British author and police officer.
Jet Harris, 71, British musician (The Shadows), throat cancer.
Charlie Metro, 91, American baseball player and manager (Detroit Tigers, Philadelphia Athletics), mesothelioma.
Peter Weigand, 69, American Olympic sprint canoer.
Kirk Wipper, 87, Canadian founder of the Canadian Canoe Museum.

19
Patrick Ahern, 92, American Roman Catholic prelate, Auxiliary Bishop of New York (1970–1994).
Kym Bonython, 90, Australian art, jazz and speedway entrepreneur.
Guillermo Ford, 74, Panamanian politician, Vice President of Panama (1989–1994).
Raymond Garlick, 84, British poet and editor.
Barrington Gaynor, 45, Jamaican footballer.
Drew Hill, 54, American football player (Los Angeles Rams, Houston Oilers, Atlanta Falcons), stroke.
Knut, 4, German-born polar bear, drowned.
Gustav Lantschner, 100, Austrian Olympic silver medal-winning (1936) alpine skier and actor.
Tom McAvoy, 74, American baseball player (Washington Senators).
Zew Wawa Morejno, 95, Polish-born American rabbi.
Mohammed Nabbous, 28, Libyan journalist, founder of Alhurra TV, shot.
Navin Nischol, 65, Indian actor, heart attack.
Jim Roslof, 64, American artist (Dungeons & Dragons), cancer.
Robert Ross, 92, American physician and medical school founder (Ross University School of Medicine and School of Veterinary Medicine), cancer.
Bob Rush, 85, American baseball player (Chicago Cubs, Milwaukee Braves, Chicago White Sox).
Leonard Webb, 89, British politician, Mayor of Thame (1975–1979).

20
John Apacible, 38, Filipino actor (Minsan Lang Kita Iibigin), shooting.
Don Canney, 80, American politician, Mayor of Cedar Rapids, Iowa (1969–1992), heart failure.
Bob Christo, 72, Australian-born Indian actor, heart attack.
Néstor de Vicente, 46, Argentine footballer, car crash.
Oliver Humperdink, 62, American professional wrestling manager, pneumonia and cancer.
Agostinho Januszewicz, 80, Polish-born Brazilian Roman Catholic prelate, Bishop of Luziânia (1989–2004).
Giovanni Nesti, 88, Italian Olympic basketball player.
Johnny Pearson, 85, British composer, arranger and pianist.
Sara Ruddick, 76, American philosopher and author, pulmonary fibrosis.
Dorothy Young, 103, American actress, assistant to Harry Houdini.

21
Michael Abramson, 62, American artist and photographer, kidney cancer.
Barry Ackerley, 76, American businessman (Ackerley Group), former owner of the Seattle SuperSonics, stroke.
Nikolai Andrianov, 58, Russian gymnast, most medaled athlete at the 1976 Summer Olympics.
Jesús Aranguren, 66, Spanish footballer and manager.
Bruce W. Beatty, 88,  Canadian graphic designer.
Hans Boskamp, 78, Dutch actor and footballer, stroke.
John L. Cashin, Jr., 82, American civil rights campaigner, kidney failure.
Ray Eden, 42, British cyclist, beaten.
Mayhew Foster, 99, American brigadier general, flew captured Hermann Göring to interrogation.
Loleatta Holloway, 64, American soul and disco musician, heart failure.
Hansl Krönauer, 78, German folk singer and composer.
Ladislav Novák, 79, Czech footballer.
Pinetop Perkins, 97, American blues musician, cardiac arrest.
Kjeld Tolstrup, 45, Danish radio disc jockey (DR P3).
Joe Wizan, 76, Mexican-born American film producer (Jeremiah Johnson, Dunston Checks In) and studio executive (20th Century Fox).

22
Artur Agostinho, 90, Portuguese sports journalist and actor.
Nadia Barentin, 74, French actress (Les Blessures assassines).
Victor Bouchard, 84, Canadian pianist, duettist with pianist Renée Morisset, respiratory disease.
Patrick Doeplah, 20, Liberian footballer.
Viljar Loor, 57, Estonian Olympic gold medal-winning (1980) volleyball player.
Jean-Guy Morissette, 73, Canadian ice hockey player.
Zoogz Rift, 57, American musician, painter and professional wrestler.
Normie Roy, 82, American baseball player (Boston Braves).
Reuven Shefer, 85, Israeli actor.
José Soriano, 93, Peruvian football player.
Helen Stenborg, 86, American actress (Doubt, The Bonfire of the Vanities, Isn't She Great), cancer.
George Alfred Walker, 81, British businessman, founder of Brent Walker.

23
Charles Joseph Adams, 86, American academic and professor of religion.
José Argüelles, 72, American New Age author.
Jean Bartik, 86, American computer programmer (ENIAC).
Henry Jerome, 93, American big band leader, trumpeter, arranger, and composer.
Živorad Kovačević, 80, Serbian diplomat.
Sir Frank Lampl, 84, British businessman.
Richard Leacock, 89, British documentary film maker (Louisiana Story, Primary, Monterey Pop, Janis).
Teodor Negoiţă, 63, Romanian polar explorer and scientist.
Trevor Storton, 61, English footballer.
Dame Elizabeth Taylor, 79, British-American actress (Who's Afraid of Virginia Woolf?, Giant, A Place in the Sun), Oscar winner (1961, 1967), heart failure.
Fred Titmus, 78, English test cricketer.
Fritz Tschannen, 90, Swiss accordion player and Olympic ski jumper.
Leonard Weinglass, 78, American civil rights lawyer, pancreatic cancer. Jayda Meyer was also, born on this day.

24
Helmy Afify Abd El-Bar, 88, Egyptian military commander.
Stig Berntsson, 80, Swedish Olympic sports shooter.
Bertrand Pernot du Breuil, 84, French Olympic equestrian.
Julian Gbur, 68, Polish-born Ukrainian Catholic hierarch, Bishop of Stryi (since 2000).
Hanni Gehring, 84, German Olympic cross-country skier.
William M. Greathouse, 91, American Nazarene minister, heart failure.
David Karimanzira, 63, Zimbabwean politician.
Robert Knights, 79, German Olympic water polo player
Dudley Laws, 76, Jamaican-born Canadian civil rights activist, kidney disease.
Anselmo Müller, 79, Brazilian Roman Catholic prelate, Bishop of Januária (1984–2008).
*Gloria Valencia de Castaño, 83, Colombian television host, respiratory failure.
Lanford Wilson, 73, American playwright.

25
Floyd Bedbury, 73, American Olympic speed skater, cancer.
Thomas Eisner, 81, American biologist, Parkinson's disease.
Fred, South African baboon, lethal injection.
Luis María Estrada Paetau, 75, Guatemalan Roman Catholic prelate, Vicar Apostolic of Izabal (1977–2004).
Edwin Gaustad, 87, American religious historian.
Maria Isakova, 92, Soviet speed skater.
Pavel Leonov, 90, Russian naïve artist.
Almena Lomax, 95, American journalist and civil rights activist, founder of the Los Angeles Tribune, after short illness.
M. Blane Michael, 68, American federal judge.
Hugo Midón, 67, Argentine theatre director and actor, after long illness. 
Thady Wyndham-Quin, 7th Earl of Dunraven and Mount-Earl, 71, Anglo-Irish aristocrat.

26
Roger Abbott, 64, Canadian actor and comedian (Royal Canadian Air Farce), chronic lymphocytic leukemia.
Joe Bageant, 64, American writer, social critic and political commentator, cancer.
Paul Baran, 84, American Internet pioneer, complications from lung cancer.
Alexander Barykin, 59, Russian musician, heart attack.
Carl Bunch, 71, American drummer (Buddy Holly and the Crickets).
Greg Centauro, 34, French pornographic actor, cardiac arrest.
Harry Coover, 94, American inventor (Super Glue).
Lula Côrtes, 61, Brazilian musician (Paêbirú), throat cancer.
Cibele Dorsa, 36, Brazilian actress and writer, suicide by jumping.
Geraldine Ferraro, 75, American politician, U.S. Representative from New York (1979–1985) and 1984 Vice Presidential nominee, multiple myeloma.
František Havránek, 87, Czech football player and manager.
Yrjö Hietanen, 83, Finnish Olympic gold medal-winning (1952) canoeist, stroke.
Diana Wynne Jones, 76, British fantasy author (Howl's Moving Castle), lung cancer.
Enn Klooren, 70, Estonian actor.
Jean-Philippe Lecat, 75, French politician.
Kazimierz Macioch, 78, Polish Olympic wrestler
Raymond-Marie Tchidimbo, 90, Guinean Roman Catholic prelate, Archbishop of Conakry (1962–1979).
Robert Underwood, 76, American Negro league baseball player.
Eric Zentner, 30, American male fashion model, traffic collision.

27
Jeff Andrus, 64, American screenwriter, congestive heart failure.
Sir Clement Arrindell, 79, Kittitian politician, Governor-General (1983–1995).
David E. Davis, 80, American automotive writer, editor and publisher (Car and Driver, Automobile), complications from bladder surgery.
Adolfo Donayre, 77, Peruvian footballer 
Lawrence Elion, 93, British actor.
Farley Granger, 85, American actor (Strangers on a Train, Rope), natural causes.
H. R. F. Keating, 84, British crime fiction writer.
Ellen McCormack, 84, American anti-abortion activist and politician, two-time Presidential candidate (1976, 1980).
DJ Megatron, 32, American disc jockey, shot.
Günther Mund, 76, German-born Chilean Olympic diver, plane crash.
Dorothea Puente, 82, American serial killer, natural causes.
George Tooker, 90, American painter, kidney failure.

28
Supyan Abdullayev, 54, Chechen field commander, airstrike.
Wenche Foss, 93, Norwegian actress, natural causes.
Lee Hoiby, 85, American composer, metastatic melanoma.
Sonia Osorio, 83, Colombian ballet dancer and choreographer, respiratory failure.
Esben Storm, 60, Danish-born Australian actor, director and producer, heart attack.
Guy M. Townsend, 90, American Air Force brigadier general and test pilot.

29
José Alencar, 79, Brazilian entrepreneur and politician, Vice-President (2003–2010), multiple organ failure.
Bob Benny, 84, Belgian singer.
Iakovos Kambanellis, 88, Greek author, playwright, poet, lyricist and journalist, kidney failure.
Edith Klestil, 78, Austrian first lady (1992–1998), first wife of President Thomas Klestil, cancer.
Neil Reimer, 89, Canadian politician, Leader of the Alberta New Democratic Party (1962–1968).
Jim Seymour, 64, American football player (Chicago Bears).
Ângelo de Sousa, 73, Portuguese painter, sculptor, draftsman and professor, cancer.
Alan Tang, 64, Hong Kong actor, film producer and director, stroke.
Robert Tear, 72, British opera singer, cancer.
Aarne Vehkonen, 83, Finnish Olympic weightlifter.
Endre Wolf, 97, Hungarian violinist.

30
Harley Allen, 55, American bluegrass and country singer, cancer.
Jacques Amir, 78, Israeli politician.
Roshan Atta, 71, Pakistani actress.
Ashurbanipal Babilla, 66, Assyrian-Iranian actor, theatre director, playwright and visual artist.
Jorge Camacho, 77, Cuban painter.
Jack Fulk, 78, American businessman, co-founder of Bojangles' Famous Chicken 'n Biscuits.
Tamar Golan, 76, Israeli journalist and diplomat.
Lyudmila Gurchenko, 75, Russian film actress and singer, People's Artist of the USSR.
Johnny Harra, 64, American actor, Elvis impersonator.
Denis McLean, 80, New Zealand diplomat, academic, author and civil servant.
Wally Peterson, 93, American actor, singer and stage manager.
Nutan Prasad, 65, Indian actor, after long illness.
Churyo Sato, 98, Japanese sculptor.
Liaquat Soldier, 59, Pakistani comedian, heart attack.

31
Sparky Adams, 93, American basketball player.
Tony Barrell, 70, British-born Australian broadcaster and writer.
Gil Clancy, 88, American Hall of Fame boxing trainer.
Alan Fitzgerald, 75, Australian journalist, cancer.
Oddvar Hansen, 89, Norwegian footballer and coach (SK Brann).
Claudia Heill, 29, Austrian judoka, silver medalist at the 2004 Summer Olympics, suspected suicide.
Tom Kelleher, 85, American football official (1960–1987), complications from pneumonia.
Vassili Kononov, 88, Russian military veteran and war criminal.
Ishbel MacAskill, 70, Scottish Gaelic singer and heritage campaigner.
Mel McDaniel, 68, American country music singer ("Baby's Got Her Blue Jeans On"), cancer.
Boško Radonjić, 67, Serbian nationalist, after short illness.
Edward Stobart, 56, British haulage contractor and entrepreneur.
Henry Taub, 83, American entrepreneur, founder of Automatic Data Processing, leukemia.

References

2011-03
 03